Dunlop Aircraft Tyres is a tyre-manufacturing company in Birmingham, England, that claims to be world's only specialist aircraft tyre manufacturer and retreader, for aircraft landing gear (also known as undercarriage).

History
It was established in 1910 as part of Dunlop Rubber, the initial company which itself had been founded by John Boyd Dunlop, a Scottish vet, in 1889.

It was Dunlop, the original company, who designed the brakes for Concorde and had also invented Maxaret, the world's first anti-lock braking system (ABS), in the early 1950s which improved stopping distances for aircraft. Michelin introduced the first aircraft radial tyre, the Air X, in 1981.

In 1996 it became an independent company.

In July 2011 DATL was awarded a The Queen's Award for Enterprise: International Trade (Export), for six years of export growth.

Structure
It is situated near Fort Dunlop in Birmingham, between the M6 and A38. The Managing Director is Ian Edmondson.

The company also has after-market service centres and retreading factories in China and in the US.

Products
It can supply tyres for over 300 different types of aircraft in the civil and military markets. 80% of its products are exported.

See also
 Aerospace industry in the United Kingdom
 Dunlop (brands)
 List of aircraft tire companies

References

External links
 

Tyre manufacturers of England
Aircraft component manufacturers of the United Kingdom
Aircraft undercarriage
Manufacturing companies based in Birmingham, West Midlands
Manufacturing companies established in 1910